Ken Haller was an American politician. He served as a Democratic member of the Nevada Assembly from 1986 to 1988 and again from 1990 to 1994, representing District 27 in Washoe County.

Background and career
Haller was born in Baltimore, Maryland, and served in the United States Air Force during World War II. He graduated from Columbia University in 1957 and moved to Sparks, Nevada in 1959 where he became a teacher.  Before serving in the Legislature, Haller was the president of the Washoe County Teachers' Association and was also active in the state and county Democratic parties.  Beginning in 1982, Haller and Republican Assemblyman Bruce Bogaert ran for the same Assembly seat five times, with three of those elections resulting in the seat switching hands.

Elections

References

1922 births
2006 deaths
Politicians from Baltimore
Politicians from Sparks, Nevada
Columbia University alumni
Democratic Party members of the Nevada Assembly
20th-century American politicians
Schoolteachers from Nevada
United States Army Air Forces personnel of World War II